Thornton Curtis is a village and civil parish in the North Lincolnshire district of Lincolnshire, England, approximately  south-east from the town of Barton-upon-Humber. The population (including Burnham) at the 2011 census was 295.

The name Thornton is from the Old English thorn+tun, meaning "village where thorn trees grow." In the 1086 Domesday Book the name is written as "Torentune".  The origin of the Curtis part of the village name is unknown.

The village is served by Thornton Abbey railway station.

Notable buildings 

Nearby is the 12th-century Thornton Abbey and the Grade I listed Abbots Lodge, a country house built on the monastic ruins for the MP Sir Vincent Skinner.

The parish church is a Grade I listed building dedicated to Saint Lawrence and dating from the 12th century. It consists of  a 13th-century chancel, a nave, aisles, south porch and an embattled 13th-century western tower with eight pinnacles and containing 5 bells. The church was restored 1884 by James Fowler of Louth which included rebuilding the south porch, and new nave and chancel roofs. There is a 12th-century square black Tournai marble font, with opposed pairs of carved animals to sides, standing on a cylindrical column with shafts to each corner on a square base.

Thornton Hall is a Grade II* listed country house built between 1695 and 1700 by Sir Rowland Wynne.

There is one public house in the village, the Thornton Hunt, which dates from the 18th century and is Grade II listed.

Historical and latest population/demographic details 
The population of Thornton Curtis remained relatively stable for the 110 years from 1850 to 1960; since 1960 a marked decline can be seen.

Information from the United Kingdom Census 2001:

Number of households in the parish: 116 (50% detached houses or bungalows).
Of the 246 residents, 117 were male and 129 female.
Over 50% of residents fell into the 30- to 59-year-old age categories.
Ethnicity: 97.6% British White.
Unemployment Rate: 2.48%.
Household Owner/Occupier (either outright or with mortgage): 64.1%.
Car ownership by household (at least one car per household): 88.7%.
33.2% of the residents held no formal qualifications.
8.4% of residents held Degree level or equivalent qualifications.

References

External links 

"Thornton Curtis", Genuki
North Lincolnshire Local History Site
2001 Census Details for the parish of Thornton Curtis
Location Map

Villages in the Borough of North Lincolnshire
Civil parishes in Lincolnshire